Football is the most popular sport in Norway in terms of active membership (by television viewership football comes third, behind winter sports biathlon and cross-country skiing). The Football Association of Norway was founded in 1902 and the first international match was played in 1908. There are 1,822 registered football clubs and about 25,000 teams. There are 393,801 (104,597 of them are girls/women) registered football players, which means that 8.5% of the population play organized football.

History
The first football team in Norway was probably started by a buekorps in Bergen, Nygaards Bataljon, in 1883. In 1885 the first Norwegian club however, Idrætsforeningen Odd, was founded in Skien. The footballing interest was very low, and was put on ice after a few months. However, the club Odd Grenland started up with football again in 1894, and are now Norway's oldest football club. The Football Association of Norway (the NFF), was founded in 1902, and quickly established a cup competition. After the NFF joined FIFA in 1908, Norway had its first ever international match, away against Sweden in Gothenburg; despite Norway taking the lead after a mere 45 seconds, Sweden went on to win 11-3. In 1911 Norway hosted its first international in Oslo, again against Sweden; this time Norway lost 4-0. In 1912 the Norway national team attended the Olympic Games, and were knocked out after losing to Denmark and Austria 7-0 and 1-0 respectively. The NFF hosted the FIFA congress in Oslo in 1914, where a national league was established with six teams competed for the title Drafn, Frigg, Kvik/Halden, Larvik Turn, Mercantile and Odd. Drafn from Drammen went on to be the first league winners. At the 1936 Summer Olympics, the Norway national men's team won their only medal (bronze). In the relatively successful tournament Norway beat Turkey and hosts Germany 4-0 and 2-0 respectively, losing to Italy in the semi-final, then beating Poland 3-2 in the third-place play-off to take the bronze medal. The team is known in Norway as "Bronselaget" meaning the Bronze team.
The Norwegian football team won 2-1 to Brazil in 1998. Norway is also the only national team in history to have an undefeated record vs Brazil, Playing 4 matches and winning 2 and drawing the other 2.

League system

The current national league system administered by the Norges Fotballforbund is organised as, from 2017 season, 1-1-2-6, where Eliteserien is the highest Norwegian level and OBOS-ligaen the second highest, followed by two third level (PostNord-ligaen) and six fourth level (Norsk Tipping-ligaen).

Cup system

Seasons
The national cup (Norwegian Championship) has been contested since 1902 and is the oldest football tournament in the country.

Norwegian football began to have regular seasons from 1937, when Norgesserien started with the inaugural 1937–38 season. Before that, tournaments and leagues were played irregularly. In 1963, Norwegian football changed from autumn-spring to spring-autumn seasons. The league football was suspended during the World War II.

European competitions

UEFA Champions League
The following teams have qualified for elimination rounds in the UEFA Champions League.

Rosenborg BK (1996-97 - Quarter-finals)
Molde FK (1999-00 - Group stage)
Rosenborg played in the Champions League on 10 further occasions.

National team

Men

Women

+20,000-capacity football stadiums in Norway

See also
 List of Norwegian football league champions
 List of football stadiums in Norway

Bibliography

References